Habalakatti is a village in the Kushtagi taluk of Koppal district in the Indian state of Karnataka.

Demographics
As of 2001 India census, Habalakatti had a population of 1,817 with 914 males and 903 females and 297 Households.

See also
Gajendragad
Ron
Kushtagi
Koppal
Karnataka

References

Villages in Koppal district